Rainer Brandt (born 19 January 1936) is a German film actor. He appeared in 40 films between 1959 and 1986. He was born in Berlin, Germany.

Selected filmography
Actor
 The Red Hand (1960)
 The Juvenile Judge (1960) as Kurt
 Horrors of Spider Island (1960) as Bobby
 The Avenger (1960) as Reggie Conolly
 Carnival Confession (1960) as Ferdinand Bäumler
 Das Riesenrad (1961) as Lothar Höpfner
  (1962) as Friedrich
  (1962) as Berthold
 Die Rechnung – eiskalt serviert (1966) as Stanley
 Funeral in Berlin (1966) as Benjamin
 The Hound of Blackwood Castle (1968)
 Street Acquaintances of St. Pauli (1968)

German dubbing/voice acting
 The Indian Scarf (1963) as Voice on the telephone
 The Last Ride to Santa Cruz (1964) as Pedro Ortiz (played by Mario Adorf)
 The Persuaders! (1971, TV series) as Danny Wilde (played by Tony Curtis)

References

External links

1936 births
Living people
German male film actors
20th-century German male actors
Male actors from Berlin